Idiopsar is a genus of Neotropical seed-eating birds in the tanager family Thraupidae.

Taxonomy and species list
The genus Idiopsar was introduced in 1867 by the American ornithologist John Cassin to accommodate the newly described boulder finch. The name combines the Ancient Greek idios meaning "distinct" or "peculiar"  with psar meaning "starling".

This genus formerly contained a single species, the boulder finch. A molecular phylogenetic study of the tanager family (Thraupidae) published in 2014 found that the boulder finch was a member of a clade that contained three species assigned to other genera. In the ensuing reorganization of generic boundaries, these three species were assigned to Idiopsar. The same genetic study found that Idiopsar is sister to the tit-like dacnis in the monospecific genus Xenodacnis. 

The genus contains four species.

 Red-backed sierra finch, Idiopsar dorsalis (formerly assigned to Phrygilus; alternatively placed in Ephippiospingus)
 White-throated sierra finch, Idiopsar erythronotus (formerly assigned to Phrygilus; alternatively placed in Ephippiospingus)
 Glacier finch (formerly white-winged diuca finch), Idiopsar speculifer (formerly assigned to Diuca; alternatively placed in Chionodacryon)
 Boulder finch (formerly short-tailed finch), Idiopsar brachyurus

References

 
Bird genera